José Manuel Rodríguez may refer to:

 José Manuel Rodríguez (athlete) (born 1966), Spanish athlete
 Jose Manuel Rodríguez (baseball) (born 1982), Mexican baseball player
 José Manuel Rodríguez (boccia) (born 1980), Spanish boccia player
 Jose Manuel Rodriguez Benito (born 1992), Spanish football player
 José Manuel Rodríguez Cuadros, Peruvian diplomat
 José Manuel Rodríguez Delgado (1915–2011), Spanish professor of neurophysiology
 José Manuel Rodríguez Morgade (born 1984), Spanish football player
 José Manuel Rodríguez Uribes (born 1968), Spanish philosopher

See also 
 José Rodríguez (disambiguation)